Fight Night is a series of boxing video games created by EA Sports. It follows on from their previous series Knockout Kings, produced for various platforms yearly between 1998 and 2003. The series was well received critically, with the PS3 version of Fight Night Round 4 achieving a Metacritic score of  88/100, and several of the games topping sales charts.

Games

See also

 Foes of Ali
 Knockout Kings
 FaceBreaker
 EA Sports UFC

References

Boxing video games
EA Sports games
Electronic Arts franchises
Electronic Arts games
Video game franchises introduced in 2004